The Assabet River Rail Trail (ARRT) is a partially-completed multi-use rail trail running through the cities and towns of Marlborough, Hudson, Stow, Maynard, and Acton, Massachusetts, United States. It is a conversion of the abandoned Marlborough Branch of the Fitchburg Railroad. The right-of-way parallels the Assabet River in the trail's midsection. At the north end it veers north to the South Acton MBTA train station while the south end veers south to Marlborough. When fully completed, the end-to-end length will be . As of June 2020, the southwest  portion of the trail from Marlborough to Hudson and the northeast  portion running from the South Acton MBTA station to the Maynard–Stow border are completed. No current plans exist for paving the  gap in Stow and Hudson between the two trail ends.

History
The Marlborough Branch railroad was progressively lengthened so that it reached from the Acton station to Maynard by 1849, extended through Stow to Hudson in 1850, and reached its Marlborough terminus in 1855. Passenger service was discontinued in the reverse fashion, such that Marlborough's service ended in 1930, Hudson and Stow in 1939, and finally Maynard in 1958. The branch continued providing freight service into the 1960s. The last remaining rails and railroad ties in Acton and Maynard were removed in 2014.

In 1851 transcendentalist Henry David Thoreau, who lived in Concord, wrote in his famous journal about a trek to Boon's Pond—today known as Lake Boon—which on the return included a walk along the railroad tracks now replaced by the trail.

Status

Plans to convert the Marlborough Branch tracks into a rail trail date back to at least 1992. A January/February 1997 feasibility study conducted by the Commonwealth of Massachusetts supported the project's viability. The five municipalities through which the Marlborough Branch rails ran voted to approve the project in 1998.

The groundbreaking ceremony for the north end was held on July 21, 2016. The ribbon-cutting event celebrating the completion was held August 10, 2018. Completion of the north end left a  gap between the Marlborough–Hudson and Acton–Maynard portions of the trail. The east end of this gap is a dirt road known as Track Road, but no bridges over the two crossings of the Assabet River exist and some parts are on private property. Maps and updates are available on the ARRT website.

There are four boat launches providing canoe and kayak access to the Assabet River on the trail: one in Hudson at Main Street Landing; one in Stow at Magazu Landing; and two in Maynard, at White Pond Road and Ice House Landing. A map of locations of these boat launches is available on the ARRT website.

In the fall of 2018, a volunteer organization and project called Trail of Flowers began planting thousands of blooming bulbs and perennial flowering plants, bushes, and trees along the trail. Plantings in 2018 were limited to Maynard, but expanded to Acton in 2019, Marlborough in 2020, and will add Hudson in the future. Donations cover the cost of the bulbs and perennials, and volunteers plant them.

Possible future connections
A separate April 1997 feasibility study conducted by the Massachusetts Central Transportation Planning Staff proposed a Central Massachusetts Rail Trail extending continuously from the town of Berlin to Alewife station and Minuteman Bikeway in Cambridge. The proposed trail included the Marlborough Branch right-of-way in Hudson, meaning the Central Massachusetts Rail Trail would connect to and overlap with the then-proposed Assabet River Rail Trail.

In November 2013 the Massachusetts Department of Conservation and Recreation proposed a similar Mass Central Rail Trail (MCRT) – Wayside Branch project to extend the existing portions of the MCRT in Waltham to Berlin and connect to the ARRT in Hudson.

References

External links

 Assabet River Rail Trail (ARRT)
 Trail of Flowers

Protected areas of Middlesex County, Massachusetts
Bike paths in Massachusetts
Rail trails in Massachusetts
Acton, Massachusetts
Hudson, Massachusetts
Marlborough, Massachusetts
Maynard, Massachusetts
Stow, Massachusetts